Plimmer is a surname. Notable people with the surname include:

Damon Plimmer, New Zealand Anglican priest
Helen Plimmer (born 1965), British cricketer
James Plimmer (birth registered second ¼ 1901– death unknown), British rugby league footballer 
John Plimmer (1812–1905), British settler and entrepreneur in New Zealand

See also
Plimmer Towers